The 2013 Avonair Cash Spiel was held from October 4 to 6 at the Avonair Curling Club in Edmonton, Alberta as part of the 2013–14 World Curling Tour.

Men

Teams
The teams are listed as follows:

Round-robin standings
Final round-robin standings

Playoffs

Women

Teams
The teams are listed as follows:

Round-robin standings
Final round-robin standings

Playoffs

References

External links

2013 in Alberta
Curling in Alberta
2013 in Canadian curling